The 2013 FA Trophy Final was the 44th final of the Football Association's cup competition for levels 5–8 of the English football league system. The match was contested between Grimsby Town and Wrexham. It was Wrexham's first visit to Wembley Stadium in their 149-year history.

Grimsby Town defeated Buxton, Havant & Waterlooville, Welling United, Luton Town and Dartford en route to the Final.

Wrexham defeated Rushall Olympic, Solihull Moors, Sutton United, Southport and Gainsborough Trinity en route to the Final.

Overview
The final of the 2013 FA Trophy played between Wrexham and Grimsby Town ended with Wrexham winning 4–1 in a penalty shoot-out after the teams had drawn in the normal time of 90 minutes. Grimsby Town led over Wrexham with a solitary goal scored by Andy Cook in the 71st minute, but Wrexham equalised as captain Keates was fouled inside the box and Kevin Thornton scored the resulting penalty spot-kick. In the ensuing extra time both the teams failed to score leading to a penalty shoot-out. The spot kicks from Adrian Cieslewicz, Danny Wright, Chris Westwood and finally Johnny Hunt, led to Wrexham's victory. Wrexham became the first Welsh club to win the trophy.

Match

Details

References

FA Trophy Finals
Fa Trophy Final
Fa Trophy Final
Fa Trophy Final
Fa Trophy Final
Fa Trophy Final 2013
Fa Trophy Final 2013
Events at Wembley Stadium
Fa Trophy Final 2013